"" is a short story by Kyōka Izumi. It was first published in 1895.

Plot 
The story is set during the Meiji period. Countess Kibune is about to have surgery, but she refuses to receive anesthesia because she has secrets to conceal.

Movie 
In 1992 a film based on this story was produced by Genjiro Arato with the Shochiku studio, directed by Bandō Tamasaburō V.

Cast
Sayuri Yoshinaga
Masaya Kato
Kiichi Nakai
Nakamura Kankurō V

References 

1895 short stories
1992 films
Japanese short stories
1990s Japanese films